Jigoku may refer to:

 Jigoku (film), a 1960 Japanese horror film
 Jigoku: Japanese Hell, a 1999 Japanese horror film
 Hell Girl (Jigoku Shōjo), a 2005 Japanese anime
 Gate of Hell (film) (Jigokumon), a 1953 Japanese film
 Hell's Paradise: Jigokuraku, a 2018 Japanese manga
 Diyu, the hell of Chinese belief
 Naraka, the hell of Buddhist belief
 The hot springs of Beppu, Ōita, Japan